Vyšný Tvarožec is a village and municipality in Bardejov District in the Prešov Region of north-east Slovakia.

History
In historical records, the village is first mentioned in 1414.

Geography
The municipality lies at an altitude of 490 metres and covers an area of 8.224 km².
It has a population of about 130 people.

References

External links
https://web.archive.org/web/20070513023228/http://www.statistics.sk/mosmis/eng/run.html

Villages and municipalities in Bardejov District
Šariš